The Salisbury rail crash occurred on 1 July 1906, when a boat train from Plymouth to London failed to negotiate a sharp bend at more than twice the speed limit, and crashed into another train, killing 28 people. It is believed that the driver was trying to demonstrate the speed of the service, in competition with a rival railway company.

Incident 
The London and South Western Railway (LSWR) boat train from Plymouth Friary railway station to London Waterloo station failed to navigate a very sharp curve at the eastern end of Salisbury railway station. The train was completely derailed and smashed into a milk train and a light engine, killing 28 people.

The accident occurred at the same time as a short cut of the rival Great Western Railway was opening, and it was claimed that the driver of the crashed train was trying to show that his railway was capable of competitive speeds. It was also rumoured that passengers – mostly rich New Yorkers travelling to London from the transatlantic port at Plymouth – had bribed the driver to run the train as fast as possible, but there was not any evidence of this and, if anything, the train had lost time earlier. Conversely, it was stated that drivers often ran through Salisbury very fast to "get a run" at the following hill. 

The crashed train's engine was a new LSWR L12 class 4-4-0 No. 421 with a higher centre of gravity than the earlier T9 class. The most likely cause of the accident is that the driver simply did not realise the level of risk he was running, particularly as this was the first occasion on which he had taken a non-stopping train through Salisbury. Also, steam locomotives at this time, and for half a century afterwards, were not fitted with speedometers.

As a result of the crash, all trains were required to stop at Salisbury station from that point onwards (the boat train at the time had no passenger stops from Plymouth to London Waterloo, although locomotives were changed at Templecombe).

There is a memorial tablet to the 28 dead (including the driver, two firemen and the guard) in Salisbury Cathedral.

The accident was the second in a series of three derailments due to excessive speed at night in a 16-month period. The others were at Grantham in 1906 and Shrewsbury in 1907. All three resulted in deaths, including the footplate crews; the cause in each case was recorded as Driver Error but there has been much speculation since.

In 2006, historian Frogg Moody organised a memorial service at Salisbury Railway Station.

See also 
 Lists of rail accidents
 List of British rail accidents
 2021 Salisbury rail crash

Similar accidents 
  Amagasaki rail crash – 2005 – Overspeed through sharp curve.
  Santiago de Compostela derailment – 2013
  Eckwersheim derailment – 2015 
  Morpeth Railway Station – 1969,1984,1994 – three occasions, overspeed through sharp curve.

References

External links 
 Salisbury (1906) – description of the crash on the Danger Ahead website
 Official Board of Trade report (1906) at railwaysarchive.co.uk

Derailments in England
Railway accidents and incidents in Wiltshire
History of Salisbury
Railway accidents in 1906
1906 in England
1906 disasters in the United Kingdom
20th century in Wiltshire
Accidents and incidents involving London and South Western Railway
July 1906 events
Train collisions in England
Rail accidents caused by a driver's error